The Camrose Canadian was a local news publication for the Camrose, Alberta area. Founded in 1908, the paper was one of many Alberta publications owned by Postmedia Network. On June 26, 2018, Postmedia announced that the newspaper would cease publication by the end of August 2018.

See also
List of newspapers in Canada

References

External links
The Camrose Canadian

Weekly newspapers published in Alberta
Camrose, Alberta